František Hák (5 November 1903 – 16 October 1987) was a Czech cross-country skier. He competed in the men's 18 kilometre event at the 1924 Winter Olympics.

References

External links
 

1903 births
1987 deaths
Czech male cross-country skiers
Olympic cross-country skiers of Czechoslovakia
Cross-country skiers at the 1924 Winter Olympics
People from Semily District
Sportspeople from the Liberec Region